Sounds of Rain also known as Ava-ye Baran, is an IranianTV series directed by Hussein Soheilizadeh that airs on IRIB Channel 3. The series has produced 40 episodes, each 45 minutes long.

The series is about the life of a man named Taha Riahi. He is looking for his missing daughter, whose eating behavior was hoped to have been modified by medicine.

Plot 
Taha is a successful businessman and a widower living with his five year old daughter. On a business trip to Turkey, he is framed for smuggling drugs and sentenced to life in prison, so he entrusts everything he has, including his daughter, to his nephew. After 20 years, Taha is released and comes back home, but things are not exactly as he had left them. He soon realizes he may have put his trust in the wrong people.

Cast
Sam Derakhshani: Nader, Taha's nephew
Hamidreza Pegah: Taha Riahi, a successful businessman and a widower living with his five year old daughter
Elham Kharkhandeh as Zivar, Nader's wife 
Azadeh Zarei: Baran Riahi, Taha's daughter
Mobina Sadat Atashi: Baran as a child
Siavash Kheirabi: Farid, Nader and Zivar s son
Niloofar Parsa: Bita, Nader and Zivar's daughter

References

External links
Sounds of Rain at the Internet Movie Database
The Sounds of Rain  at Ifilm

Iranian television series
2010s Iranian television series
2014 Iranian television series debuts
2014 Iranian television series endings
Islamic Republic of Iran Broadcasting original programming
Persian-language television shows